Elemér Gombos (born 18 April 1915, date of death unknown) was a Hungarian swimmer. He competed in the men's 100 metre backstroke at the 1936 Summer Olympics.

References

External links
 

1915 births
Year of death missing
Hungarian male swimmers
Olympic swimmers of Hungary
Swimmers at the 1936 Summer Olympics
People from Jászapáti
Sportspeople from Jász-Nagykun-Szolnok County